Christopher J. Smith (born 15 January 1973) is an Australian born former Dutch cricketer.  Smith was a right-handed batsman.

Smith made his List A debut for the Netherlands against Cornwall in the 1st round of the 2004 Cheltenham & Gloucester Trophy which was held in 2003.  The remainder of his List A appearances for the Netherlands came in the 2004 ICC 6 Nations Challenge, with his final appearance in that competition coming against the United Arab Emirates.  In total he played 6 List A matches, scoring 128 runs at an average of 25.60, with a high score of 48.

He made a single first-class appearance for the Netherlands against Scotland in the ICC Intercontinental Cup.  In this match he batted once, scoring 14 runs in the first-innings, before being dismissed by Ryan Watson.

References

External links
Chris Smith at ESPNcricinfo
Chris Smith at CricketArchive

1973 births
Living people
Dutch people of Australian descent
Dutch cricketers